The Edward Teller Award (or the Edward Teller Medal) is an award presented every two years by the American Nuclear Society for "pioneering research and leadership in the use of laser and ion-particle beams to produce unique high-temperature and high-density matter for scientific research and for controlled thermonuclear fusion". It was established in 1999 and is named after Edward Teller. The award carries a $2000 cash prize and an engraved silver medal.

Recipients

See also
 List of physics awards
 List of prizes named after people

Publications

References

Awards established in 1991
Physics awards